Chaheshk (also Romanized as Chāheshk) is a village in Torqabeh Rural District, Torqabeh District, Torqabeh and Shandiz County, Razavi Khorasan Province, Iran. At the 2006 census, its population was 1,571, in 401 families.

References 

Populated places in Torqabeh and Shandiz County